Cristina Cini (born 11 July 1969 in Florence, Tuscany), is the first Italian woman to play the role of assistant referee in Italian professional football.

She made her debut in Serie B in the season 2002–03, assisting referee Antonio Dattilo in Triestina–Venezia (1–2), on 14 September 2002. On 24 May 2003, she debuted in Serie A, assisting referee Tiziano Pieri in Juventus–Chievo (4–3).

On 2 July 2012, she retired, with a total of 43 "assisted" matches in the top flight.

References

External links
(in Italian) Italian football federation (news about Cini);
(in Italian) calciodonna.it (news about Cini);
(in Italian) Belisario Foundation, that awarded Cini on 2003.

Italian football referees
1969 births
Living people
FIFA Women's World Cup referees
Women association football referees
Italian sportswomen